The 1934 Southern Conference men's basketball tournament took place from March 1–3, 1934 at Thompson Gym in Raleigh, North Carolina. The Washington & Lee Generals won their first Southern Conference title, led by head coach Harry "Cy" Young.

Format
The top eight finishers of the conference's ten members were eligible for the tournament. Teams were seeded based on conference winning percentage. The tournament used a preset bracket consisting of three rounds.

Bracket

* Overtime game

See also
List of Southern Conference men's basketball champions

References

Tournament
Southern Conference men's basketball tournament
Southern Conference men's basketball tournament
Southern Conference men's basketball tournament
Basketball competitions in Raleigh, North Carolina
College sports tournaments in North Carolina
College basketball in North Carolina